Straight Draw (foaled 1952) was a New Zealand bred thoroughbred racehorse, that is most notable for winning the 1957 Melbourne Cup.

Background

Straight Draw was bred by Little Avondale Stud in New Zealand.

Racing career

Straight Draw started at the odds of 13/2 in the 1957 Melbourne Cup.   For some time the race favourite that year was the legendary Tulloch, however connections decided to not run him in the race.  Under the guidance of Australian Racing Hall of Fame jockey Noel McGrowdie, Straight Draw won the race by a neck margin.

His owner, Ezra Norton, a strictly private man, remained in Sydney rather than go and watch the race. The horse's trainer Jack Mitchell was sent to collect the Cup on his behalf, avoiding having to make a speech.

Straight Draw also became the first horse to ever win The Metropolitan, Melbourne Cup and Sydney Cup in the same season.

Pedigree

References 

New Zealand racehorses
Racehorses bred in New Zealand
Racehorses trained in Australia
1952 racehorse births
Melbourne Cup winners
Sydney Cup winners